Ulyanovsky District is the name of several administrative and municipal districts in Russia:
Ulyanovsky District, Kaluga Oblast, an administrative and municipal district of Kaluga Oblast
Ulyanovsky District, Ulyanovsk Oblast, an administrative and municipal district of Ulyanovsk Oblast

See also
Ulyanovsky (disambiguation)

References